José Luis Cuevas Pietrasanta (1881–1952) was a Mexican architect who planned the Mexico City subdivisions:
In 1922, Lomas de Chapultepec
In 1926, Colonia Hipódromo (a.k.a. Hipódromo de la Condesa), in what is now known as the Condesa area, including its iconic parks Parque México and Parque España

The subdivisions were based on the principles of the Garden City as promoted by Ebenezer Howard, including ample parks and other open spaces, park islands in the middle of "grand avenues" such as Avenida Amsterdam in colonia Hipódromo.

External links
Biography of Cuevas in Guía de recorridos urbanos de la colonia hipódromo by Marisol Flores Garcí
Photo of Cuevas, plans of Colonia Hipódromo on Radio Arquitectura (blog)

References

Mexican architects
Architecture in Mexico
Mexican urban planners
Urban planning in Mexico
1881 births
1952 deaths
Mexican people of Italian descent